In Greek mythology, Phalanthus (Ancient Greek: Φάλανθος) is the name of three men.

 Phalanthus of Tanagra, one of the defenders of Thebes in the war of the Seven against Thebes. He was killed by Hippomedon.
Phalanthus of Tarentum, the Spartan founder of Tarentum. Married to Aethra.
 Phalanthus, son of Agelaus (son of Stymphalus, son of Elatus, son of Arcas). A city in Arcadia was named after him.

Notes

References 

 Pausanias, Description of Greece with an English Translation by W.H.S. Jones, Litt.D., and H.A. Ormerod, M.A., in 4 Volumes. Cambridge, MA, Harvard University Press; London, William Heinemann Ltd. 1918. . Online version at the Perseus Digital Library
 Pausanias, Graeciae Descriptio. 3 vols. Leipzig, Teubner. 1903.  Greek text available at the Perseus Digital Library.
 Publius Papinius Statius, The Thebaid translated by John Henry Mozley. Loeb Classical Library Volumes. Cambridge, MA, Harvard University Press; London, William Heinemann Ltd. 1928. Online version at the Topos Text Project.
 Publius Papinius Statius, The Thebaid. Vol I-II. John Henry Mozley. London: William Heinemann; New York: G.P. Putnam's Sons. 1928. Latin text available at the Perseus Digital Library.
 Stephanus of Byzantium, Stephani Byzantii Ethnicorum quae supersunt, edited by August Meineike (1790-1870), published 1849. A few entries from this important ancient handbook of place names have been translated by Brady Kiesling. Online version at the Topos Text Project.

Boeotian characters in Greek mythology
Arcadian mythology